Gerald F. Uelmen (born October 8, 1940) is an American attorney, writer, civil servant, and academic. He was part of O. J. Simpson's defense team during the O. J. Simpson murder case, dubbed the "Dream Team." Uelmen says he devised the memorable line used by Johnnie Cochran in the closing argument, "If it doesn't fit, you must acquit."

Uelmen is currently a professor at the Santa Clara University School of Law, where he served as dean from 1986 to 1994. He served as defense counsel in the trials of Daniel Ellsberg and Christian Brando.

In 2006, he was appointed executive director for the California Commission on the Fair Administration of Justice, created by the California State Senate to examine the causes of wrongful convictions and propose reforms of the California criminal justice system.

Bibliography
 Supreme Folly (1993) (with Rodney R Jones)
 Lessons from the Trial: The People V. O.J. Simpson (1996)
 California Evidence: A Wizard's Guide (2014)
 If It Doesn't Fit (2016)

References

External links
 Gerald Uelmen's Publications

Santa Clara University faculty
Living people
Loyola Law School faculty
American anti–death penalty activists
Loyola Marymount University alumni
Georgetown University Law Center alumni
1940 births
People from Greendale, Wisconsin
Activists from California
O. J. Simpson murder case